The gold-striped salamander or golden-striped salamander (Chioglossa lusitanica) is a species of salamander in the family Salamandridae. It is the only species of the genus Chioglossa. It is found in the north-west of Iberia (in Portugal and Spain) at an altitude of up to 1,300 m. It is threatened by habitat loss.

Description

The gold-striped salamander is a short-legged salamander with protruding eyes and a tail that makes up 2/3 of its total length. It has a smooth upper side with 10-11 coastal grooves which are dark brown to blackish and usually two parallel golden stripes on the back which can sometimes be broken. It is an agile terrestrial amphibian, and is nocturnal. It may shed its tail like a lizard if it feels threatened, and lives for about eight to 10 years. It feeds primarily on invertebrates, using its sticky tongue to catch them. They mate on land with clutches of 12-20 eggs laid between stones in running water or on the walls of caves. The larvae develop in water.

The species has two described subspecies, C. l. lusitanica and C. l. longipes.

Distribution and habitat

Its natural habitat are moist deciduous forests near streams in mountainous areas of northwest Spain and north and central Portugal and has been introduced in the Sintra Mountains, but is also found in eucalypt plantations, pine forests and even shrubland. The species has also been recorded from caves and abandoned flooded mines.

It occurs in several protected areas including the Peneda-Gerês National Park, Portugal and the Picos de Europa National Park, Spain.

Threats
The species is threatened by replacement of its habitat (especially in Spain) and fires (especially in Portugal).

Notes and references

References
 Jan Willem Arntzen, Jaime Bosch, Mathieu Denoël, Miguel Tejedo, Paul Edgar, Miguel Lizana, Iñigo Martínez-Solano, Alfredo Salvador, Mario García-París, Ernesto Recuero Gil, Paulo Sá-Sousa, Rafael Marquez 2008.  Chioglossa lusitanica.   2010.1 IUCN Red List of Threatened Species.   Downloaded on 16 May 2010.
 New Holland European Reptile and Amphibian Guide.
There is a ship in halo 3 ODST called the "Chioglossa" that is visible for a brief moment during the opening of the game

External links

 Pate at Amphibiaweb
 Page at NCBI
 Page at ARKive

Salamandridae
Endemic amphibians of the Iberian Peninsula
Amphibians described in 1864
Taxonomy articles created by Polbot